Shadows in the Deep is the second album by the Swedish death metal band Unleashed. It was released in 1992 by Century Media Records. It was dedicated to Swedish black metal singer Per "Dead" Yngve Ohlin who had committed suicide a year prior. Famous Seattle grunge band Nirvana recorded a brief cover of the song "Onward Into Countless Battles" however drummer Dave Grohl performed most of the instruments in the track and changed the lyrics to "Meat" with Kurt Cobain joining him in singing the song.

Track listing

References

Unleashed (band) albums
1992 albums
Century Media Records albums
Albums produced by Waldemar Sorychta